The Fountain at Alamo Cement Company is a Faux Bois sculpture by artist Dionicio Rodriguez. The sculpture is a concrete pond covered by a concrete palapa style roof . The sculpture was posted to the National Register of Historic Places on August 9, 2005.

References

External links
National Register Listing

National Register of Historic Places in San Antonio
Fountains in Texas
1926 sculptures
Buildings and structures in San Antonio
Buildings and structures on the National Register of Historic Places in Texas